Vice-President of Malawi is the second highest political position in Malawi.
 
The Vice-President is elected in the same ticket with the President. The President can also appoint a Second Vice-President if he desires. The position was first established in November 1994 to assist the President. However, the office has been mainly ceremonial.

List of vice-presidents of Malawi

See also
List of current vice presidents

References

Government of Malawi
Politics of Malawi
Malawi
 
1994 establishments in Malawi